Lay Sone Twal is a 2019 Burmese comedy-drama television series. It aired on MRTV-4, from April 10 to May 8, 2019, on Mondays to Fridays at 19:00 for 21 episodes.

Cast
Phone Sett Thwin as Kyaw Gyi
Khay Sett Thwin as Shwe Sin
Aung Lwin as U Ba Thet
Ayeyar as U Ayeyar Pyaung
So Pyay Myint as Sit Aye
Khant as Hnin Ei Phyu
Chit Su as Ko Too
Pwint as Ma Puu
Lucas as Mg Phone
Hsu Waddy as Waddy

References

Burmese television series
MRTV (TV network) original programming